The 1929 Rhode Island Rams football team was an American football team that represented Rhode Island State College (later renamed the University of Rhode Island) as a member of the New England Conference during the 1929 college football season. In its tenth season under head coach Frank Keaney, the team compiled a 5–2–1 record (1–1 against conference opponents) and tied for third place in the conference.

Schedule

References

Rhode Island State
Rhode Island Rams football seasons
Rhode Island State Rams football